Sir Frederick Flood, 1st Baronet, KC (1741–1 February 1824), was an Irish lawyer and politician. He was a Member of the Irish Parliament from 1776 until 1801, and then later a Member of the Parliament from 1801 until 1818. Although Flood opposed the Act of Union 1801 that merged the Kingdoms of Ireland and Great Britain, he sat as a member of the united Parliament in London until his retirement.

Family and early life
Flood was the younger son of John Flood of Farmley, County Kilkenny, and nephew of Warden Flood, chief justice of the court of king's bench in Ireland, the father of the Right Hon. Henry Flood. He was born in 1741, and was educated at Kilkenny College and at Trinity College, Dublin, where he proceeded B.A. in 1761, M.A. in 1764, LL.B. in 1766, and LL.D. in 1772. He was called to the Irish Bar in 1763, soon attained considerable legal practice, and in the social circles of Dublin was immensely popular from his wit and oddity.

He married twice; firstly Lady Juliana Annesley, the daughter of Richard Annesley, 6th Earl of Anglesey and secondly Frances, the daughter of Sir Henry Cavendish, 1st Baronet of Doveridge, with whom he had an only surviving daughter Frances, who married Richard Solly of Walthamstow and York Place, London, whose son Frederick became Sir Fredericks's heir.

He succeeded to handsome estates, including Ballynaslaney House, County Wexford from both his parents, and in 1776 was elected to the Irish House of Commons as member for Enniscorthy.

Political career
He sat for Enniscorthy until 1783. From 1783 to 1790 he was M.P. for Ardfert, and in 1796–7 for Carlow Borough. His relationship to Henry Flood did more for his reputation then his own abilities, and he consistently followed in his cousin's footsteps. In 1778 he was made a King's Counsel and was elected a bencher of the King's Inns. He was the Custos Rotulorum of County Wexford. On 3 June 1780 he was created a baronet in the Baronetage of Ireland of Newton Ormonde on the County of Kilkenny and of Banna Lodge in the County of Wexford. Two years later he married Lady Juliana Annesley, daughter of Arthur Annesley, 5th Earl of Anglesey, and he took a prominent part in the volunteer movement, being elected colonel of the Wexford regiment.

In many debates which preceded the abolition of the Irish parliament Flood was a frequent speaker. Sir Jonah Barrington calls him an ostentatious blunderer, whose 'bulls' did not contain the pith of sound sense which underlay the mistakes of Sir Boyle Roche. He adds that Flood would rashly accept any suggestions made to him while speaking, and one day, just after he had declared 'that the magistrates of Wexford deserved the thanks of the lord-lieutenant,’ he added, on some wit's suggestion, 'and should be whipped at the cart's tail'. He steadily opposed the Act of Union, but when that measure was carried he did not retire from politics, but sat in the united House of Commons for County Wexford from 1812 to 1818. He made no particular impression there.

Later life
His only son died unmarried in 1800, and it was proposed to perpetuate Flood's title by creating him a baronet of the United Kingdom, with remainder to his only daughter Frances, who was married to Richard Solly, esq. He died on 1 February 1824, before the patent for this new honour had passed the great seal, and left his estates to his grandson, Frederick, who took the name of Flood in addition to his own.

References

External links
 

1741 births
1824 deaths
People educated at Kilkenny College
Alumni of Trinity College Dublin
Politicians from County Kilkenny
Members of the Parliament of Ireland (pre-1801) for County Wexford constituencies
Members of the Parliament of Ireland (pre-1801) for County Kerry constituencies
Members of the Parliament of Ireland (pre-1801) for County Carlow constituencies
Irish MPs 1776–1783
Irish MPs 1783–1790
Irish MPs 1790–1797
Members of the Parliament of the United Kingdom for County Wexford constituencies (1801–1922)
UK MPs 1812–1818
Baronets in the Baronetage of Ireland
18th-century King's Counsel
19th-century King's Counsel
18th-century Irish lawyers